Peter McDonald (1836 – 12 March 1891) was an Irish teacher, businessman and politician.

Born in Kilfinane, County Limerick, the son of Randal McDonald, he became a teacher in Blackrock College, then a commercial traveller, and then a partner in Cantwell and McDonald, wine merchants and distillers of Dublin.

In the general election of 1885 he was elected member of parliament for North Sligo, a seat which he held until his death in 1891. He died at his home in Kingstown (Dún Laoghaire).

Endnotes

External links 

1836 births
1891 deaths
Irish Parliamentary Party MPs
Members of the Parliament of the United Kingdom for County Sligo constituencies (1801–1922)
UK MPs 1885–1886
UK MPs 1886–1892
Politicians from County Limerick
Businesspeople from County Limerick